Land of Ashes is a 2019 Costa Rican drama film directed by Sofía Quirós Ubeda. It was selected as the Costa Rican entry for the Best International Feature Film at the 93rd Academy Awards, but it was not nominated.

Plot
Following the disappearance of her mother, a 13-year-old girl is left to look after her grandfather.

Cast
 Smashleen Gutiérrez as Selva
 Humberto Samuels as Tata
 Hortensia Smith as Elena
 Keha Brown as Winter

See also
 List of submissions to the 93rd Academy Awards for Best International Feature Film
 List of Costa Rican submissions for the Academy Award for Best International Feature Film

References

External links
 

2019 films
2019 drama films
Costa Rican drama films
2010s Spanish-language films